Cham Gaz or Cham-e Gaz may refer to:

Cham-e Gaz, Fars
Cham Gaz, Lorestan
Amirabad Cham Gaz